A list of notable people from Bakersfield, California, in order to be included they need to have an article and clear connection to the city;

Notable people

Arts

Designers 

 Marc Davis – animator and one of Disney's Nine Old Men, born in Bakersfield.
 Poy Gum Lee – architect, died in Bakersfield

Visual artists 

 Greg Colson – visual artist
 Tyrus Wong – calligrapher, artist, animator, married in 1937 in Bakersfield

Business, entrepreneur 

 Ric Drasin – designer of Gold's Gym and World Gym logos, retired professional wrestler, actor, author

Crime 
Vincent Brothers – convicted murderer; shot and stabbed five members of his family to death
Rodolfo Cadena – Rudy "Cheyenne" Cadena, one of the founders of the Mexican Mafia, basis of character played by Edward James Olmos in the film American Me

Entertainment

Film, television, actors, models 

 Ana Lily Amirpour – filmmaker, director, writer
 Noah Beery – actor
Robert Beltran – actor
 Justin Berry – former teenage webcam pornographer and public speaker
 Kelli Garner – actress
 Frank Gifford – television sportscaster, college and professional football player
 Justin Gordon – actor, producer, artist
 Fay Helm – actress
 Brian Hooks – actor, Soul Plane, Three Strike
Nathan Jung – actor, martial artist, stunt coordinator
 Dalene Kurtis – model, former Playboy Playmate of the Year
 Joanne Linville – actress
 Guy Madison – actor
 Roger Mathey – theatrical director, actor, playwright, producer
 Derek Mears – actor and stuntman
 Michelle St. John – actress, singer, director, producer
 Sigrid Valdis – actress
 Anjelika Washington - actress, "DC: Stargirl", "Netflix's Tall Girl 1 & 2"

Musicians 

 David Benoit - jazz pianist
 Jo Ann Castle - pianist, The Lawrence Welk Show'
 Brandon Cruz - punk musician and former child actor
 Merle Haggard - singer, Country Music Hall of Fame inductee
 Michael Lockwood - guitarist and music producer
 Kareem Lopez - musician
 Mary Osborne - jazz guitarist
 Buck Owens - singer, musician Country Music Hall of Fame inductee
 Gregory Porter - singer
 Sheléa - singer-songwriter
 Lawrence Tibbett - baritone of the New York Metropolitan Opera
 Grant Whitson - drummer for Arlington

Bands 

 Adema - rock band (Tim Fluckey, Dave DeRoo, Kris Kohls, Mark Chavez, Mike Ransom)
 Burning Image - deathrock band (Moe Adame, Tony Bonanno, Paul Burch, Anthony Leyva)
 The Def Dames - female rap duo, hip hop musicians
 Korn - Grammy Award-winning metal band
 Reginald "Fieldy" Arvizu
 Jonathan Davis
 James "Munky" Shaffer
 David Silveria
 Brian "Head" Welch

Government, law, politics 

Leonard L. Alvarado - Medal of Honor Recipient, Specialist 4th Class, United States Army - Republic of Vietnam 1969
General Edward Fitzgerald Beale - Superintendent of Indian Affairs for California and Nevada (1850s), Surveyor General of California and Nevada (1860s), U.S. Ambassador to Austria-Hungary (1870s), founder of Tejon Ranch
 Vince Fong - Politician in California State Assembly
Harvey Hall - past Mayor of Bakersfield (2001-2016) 
Kevin McCarthy - California Congressman, House Republican Leader, 55th Speaker of The United States House of Representatives
Ken Mettler - past president (2008-2010) of the California Republican Assembly
Erik Paulsen - Minnesota Congressman
Walter W. Stiern - California Democratic State Senator
Earl Warren - Chief Justice of the United States Supreme Court, former governor of California

Science, medicine, academia 
Hans Einstein - world's foremost authority on Valley Fever
Carver Mead - pioneer in the field of VLSI design, inventor of the concept of neuromorphic computing

Sports

Olympics
Jake Varner - Olympic Gold Medalist wrestler at 2012 London Games

Baseball
 Larry Barnes - California Angels first baseman
 Corbin Burnes - Milwaukee Brewers pitcher
 Johnny Callison - Philadelphia Phillies right fielder
 Phil Dumatrait - Pittsburgh Pirates pitcher, first-round draft pick
 Jack Hiatt - catcher
 Leon Lee - Nippon Professional Baseball player and manager
 Colby Lewis - Texas Rangers pitcher, first-round draft pick
 William "Buckshot" May - Pittsburgh Pirates pitcher
 Brent Morel - Chicago White Sox third baseman
 Kurt Miller - pitcher for Florida Marlins and Chicago Cubs
 Steve Ontiveros - infielder for San Francisco Giants and Chicago Cubs
 Dave Rader - catcher
 Rick Sawyer - pitcher for the New York Yankees and San Diego Padres
 Todd Walker - second baseman
 Bruce Walton - pitcher for Montreal Expos, pitching coach for Toronto Blue Jays
 Jake Woods - Seattle Mariners pitcher

Basketball
Nikki Blue - New York Liberty guard (WNBA)
Fred Boyd - NBA player
Chris Childs - ABA/NBA guard (1989–2003) [New Jersey Nets, New York Knicks, Toronto Raptors]
J. R. Sakuragi (formerly J.R. Henderson) - player for Memphis Grizzlies
Lonnie Shelton - Seattle SuperSonics all-star
Robert Swift - Tokyo Apache (Japan) center
Tyrone Wallace - Los Angeles Clippers guard

Football

Mike Ariey - offensive tackle for Green Bay Packers
Jon Baker - NFL and CFL player
Theo Bell - wide receiver for Pittsburgh Steelers, earned Super Bowl rings in 1979 and 1980
Jeff Buckey - starting offensive lineman for Miami Dolphins
Vern Burke - tight end for San Francisco 49ers, New Orleans Saints, and Atlanta Falcons
David Carr - quarterback, first overall selection in 2002 NFL Draft (Houston Texans), won Super Bowl with New York Giants
Derek Carr - quarterback for Oakland/Las Vegas Raiders, Mountain West Conference Player of the Year for Fresno State
Frank Gifford - Pro Football Hall of Fame inductee, broadcaster
Cory Hall - safety for Cincinnati Bengals, Atlanta Falcons, and Washington Redskins
Joe Hawley - center for Tampa Bay Buccaneers
A.J. Jefferson - free safety for Arizona Cardinals
Cody Kessler - quarterback for Cleveland Browns and USC Trojans
Rodney Leisle - defensive tackle for New Orleans Saints, member of 2009 Super Bowl-winning team
Jordan Love- backup quarterback for the Green bay packers
Bob McCaffrey - center for USC Trojans and Green Bay Packers
Brent McClanahan - running back for Minnesota Vikings
Ray Mansfield - center for Pittsburgh Steelers
Brock Marion - Dallas Cowboys Super Bowl champion and Pro Bowl player
Jerry Marion - wide receiver for Pittsburgh Steelers, father of Brock
Ryan Mathews - running back for Philadelphia Eagles and former Fresno State All-American
Aaron Merz - offensive lineman for University of California and Buffalo Bills
Stephen Neal - lineman for New England Patriots, Super Bowl champion, NCAA wrestling champion, world gold medalist, Olympian
Mark Nichols - wide receiver for Detroit Lions
Jared Norris - NFL player
Larry Parker - wide receiver for USC Trojans and Kansas City Chiefs
Joey Porter - All-Pro and Pro Bowl outside linebacker, member of Pittsburgh Steelers Super Bowl champion team in 2006
Rocky Rasley - guard for Detroit Lions
D. J. Reed - free safety for New York Jets
Randy Rich - defensive back for Detroit Lions, Denver Broncos, and Cleveland Browns
Greg Robinson - defensive coordinator for Denver Broncos, University of Michigan
Ken Ruettgers - offensive tackle for Green Bay Packers
Colton Schmidt - punter for Buffalo Bills
Rashaan Shehee - running back for Kansas City Chiefs
L. J. Shelton - offensive tackle for Arizona Cardinals
Jeff Siemon - Pro Bowl linebacker for Minnesota Vikings, inducted to College Football Hall of Fame in 2006
Kevin Smith - tight end for UCLA, Oakland Raiders, and Green Bay Packers
Jeremy Staat - defensive lineman for Pittsburgh Steelers, United States Marine
Jason Stewart - defensive tackle for Indianapolis Colts in 1994
Michael Stewart - safety for Miami Dolphins
John Tarver - running back for New England Patriots in 1970s
Leonard Williams - defensive lineman for New York Jets
Dick Witcher - wide receiver for San Francisco 49ers
Louis Wright - All-Pro defensive back for Denver Broncos, member of 1970s NFL all-decade team
Rodney Wright - wide receiver for Fresno State and Buffalo Bills

Motorsports
Kevin Harvick - NASCAR driver, 2007 Daytona 500 winner and 2014 Sprint Cup Series champion
Casey Mears - NASCAR driver
Rick Mears - 4-time Indianapolis 500 winner
Roger Mears - Baja 1000 winner
Blaine Perkins - NASCAR driver
Ryan Reed - NASCAR driver
Bruce Sarver - NHRA champion
George Snider - 22-time competitor Indianapolis 500

Boxing
Ruben Castillo - WBO and NABO lightweight champion, WBC featherweight and super featherweight contender
Michael Dallas, Jr. - Golden Gloves silver medalist, light welterweight contender
Jack Johnson - first African-American heavyweight champion, member of World Boxing Hall of Fame
Jerry Quarry - national Golden Gloves champion, heavyweight professional boxer, fought Muhammad Ali and Joe Frazier
Mike Quarry - light-heavyweight professional boxer
Joey Guillen - light-heavyweight professional boxer

Track & Field
Lonnie Spurrier - middle-distance runner, Olympian (1956), set world's record in the half-mile run in 1955

Soccer
Cami Privett - Former NWSL Soccer Player for the Houston Dash

Writers, poets, journalists 

 Frank Bidart - poet
 James Chapman - novelist and publisher
 Robert Duncan - poet (lived in Bakersfield 1927-32)
 Georgie Starbuck Galbraith - writer of light verse
 Gerald Haslam - author
 Lawrence Kimble - Hollywood screenwriter

References

External links 
 City of Bakersfield official website
 Bakersfield Convention & Visitors Bureau
 Bakersfield Downtown Business and Property Owner's Association

 
Bakersfield
Bakersfield, California

af:Bakersfield
ar:بكرسفيلد، كاليفورنيا
bg:Бейкърсфийлд
ca:Bakersfield
da:Bakersfield
de:Bakersfield
es:Bakersfield (California)
fr:Bakersfield (Californie)
gl:Bakersfield, California
ko:베이커즈필드
hr:Bakersfield, Kalifornija
id:Bakersfield, California
it:Bakersfield
pam:Bakersfield, California
ht:Bakersfield, Kalifòni
nl:Bakersfield (Californië)
ja:ベーカーズフィールド (カリフォルニア州)
no:Bakersfield
pl:Bakersfield (Kalifornia)
pt:Bakersfield (Califórnia)
ro:Bakersfield, California
ru:Бейкерсфилд (Калифорния)
simple:Bakersfield, California
sr:Бејкерсфилд
fi:Bakersfield
sv:Bakersfield
tl:Bakersfield, California
tr:Bakersfield, Kaliforniya
vi:Bakersfield, California
vo:Bakersfield (California)
zh:贝克斯菲尔德 (加利福尼亚州)